Altonaer FC von 1893, commonly known as Altona 93 and abbreviated to AFC, is a German association football club based in the Altona district of the city of Hamburg. The football team is a department of a larger sports club which also offers handball, karate, table tennis, and volleyball.



History
Late in the nineteenth century, a number of sports having their origins in England – including cricket, rugby, and football – were introduced to continental Europe where they enjoyed considerable popularity. This club was founded on 29 July 1893 as Altonaer Cricketclub by a group of students who also demonstrated an early interest in football. In 1894, the club was renamed Altonaer Fussball und Cricket Club and then Altonaer Fussball Club in quick succession.

Altona is one of Germany's oldest football clubs: they were part of the Altona-Hamburg football league formed in 1894, as well as one of the founding clubs of the German Football Association (Deutscher Fussball Bund or German Football Association) at Leipzig in 1900. In 1903 at their home ground, they hosted the first-ever German national championship final played between VfB Leipzig and DFC Prague. The match was refereed by AFC player Franz Behr, who also served as the vice-chairman of the newly formed DFB until 1904. The club rescued the match by providing a new ball when the original one proved to be unsuitable for play. The hosts of the country's first title match never won or even played in a national final, being able to advance only as far as the semi-finals in 1903 and 1909, and the quarter-finals in 1914.

In 1919, the club merged with Altonaer TS 1880 in a union that lasted until 1922, during which time they were known as VfL Altona. After the break-up the team played as Altonaer FC 1893 VfL. Another merger in 1938 with Borussia 03 Bahrenfeld created Altonaer FC 93 Borussia. Between the end of World War I and the end of World War II the team played continuously in the country's top-flight leagues. Under the Third Reich German football was re-organized into sixteen Gauliga and AFC played first in the Gauliga Nordmark, and later in the Gauliga Hamburg.

After the war the club picked up play in the Stadtliga Hamburg before earning promotion to the first tier Oberliga Nord. Their best results were a pair of third-place finishes in 1954 and 1958, and semi-final appearances in the DFB-Pokal (German Cup) in 1955 and 1964. After the formation of the Bundesliga – Germany's new professional league – in 1963, Altona found itself in the second-tier Regionalliga Nord where they played until 1968. Between 1969 and 1981 Altona played third and fourth division ball before slipping to Landesliga Hamburg-Hammonia (V). They returned to using their old name, Altona FC, in 1979.

The club has moved up and down between the third and fifth tiers since the mid-1980s. In 1997, they found they were unable to sustain themselves financially in the Regionalliga Nord (IV) and after a single season at the professional level voluntarily withdrew to lower league play. The club is currently again playing in the Regionalliga Nord after promotion in 2019.

Fans
Altona despite their current low division have a relatively large local following, having the third largest fan-base in Hamburg. Their origins are similar of that of neighbours FC St Pauli and therefore the fans are of a similar left-wing political persuasion, which means that there are little tensions between the two local teams, but they do contest a local derby with Hamburger SV although mainly with their reserve team.

Recent seasons

Key

Current squad

Honours
The club's honours:
 Northern German football championship
 Champions: 1909, 1914
 Oberliga Hamburg/Schleswig-Holstein (IV)
 Champions: 1996
 Verbandsliga Hamburg (II)
 Champions: 1948, 1950
 Landesliga Hamburg-Hansa (IV)
 Champions: 1972
 Landesliga Hamburg-Hammonia (V)
 Champions: 1983
 Hamburger Pokal
 Winners: 1984, 1985, 1989, 1994

Stadium
Since 1909 the team has played in the AFC-Kampfbahn, renamed the Adolf-Jäger-Kampfbahn (AJK) in 1944. Jäger was killed trying to defuse an Allied bomb in Altona while working as a volunteer in a bomb squad, within weeks of the stadium-naming ceremony honouring him. The facility has a capacity of 8,000 spectators (1,500 seats). Germany's first national championship was played at the club's original grounds, Exerzierweide, in Altona's Bahrenfeld quarter (known today as Schnackenburgallee) on 31 May 1903.

The stadium was featured as a stop during the German leg of The Amazing Race 16, an American television program, in which participants had to kick footballs through targets.

References

External links

The Abseits Guide to German Soccer

Football clubs in Hamburg
Association football clubs established in 1893
1893 establishments in Germany